Albert Van Coile (27 March 1900 – 4 April 1927) was a Belgian footballer. He played for Cercle Brugge. He also appeared once for the Belgium national football team.

Van Coile is especially remembered by the Cercle Brugge fans because he is the only player who died because of injuries sustained in a Cercle Brugge match. During a tournament in Tourcoing, Van Coile was playing as centre forward by occasion. In the match against US Tourcoing, he collided with the local goalkeeper. Van Coile suffered no visible injuries, but when his situation deteriorated the day after the match, doctors discovered a tear in his bowels. A speedy operation had no result. Van Coile died on 4 April.

His funeral received great attention in the media as well as in Bruges itself, where all the flags were lowered to half-staff in his honour. Van Coile's team, Cercle Brugge, were namely on the verge of becoming national champions in 1927. Ironically, during the funeral, Cercle's chairman René de Peellaert caught pneumonia, of which he died 14 days later.

Further reading
 Roland Podevijn, Cercle Brugge 1899–1989, K.S.V. Cercle Brugge, 1989, pp. 59–62

External links
 Albert Van Coile historical info at the Cercle Brugge official site 
 Cerclemuseum.be 
 

1900 births
1927 deaths
Association football players who died while playing
Belgian footballers
Belgium international footballers
Cercle Brugge K.S.V. players
Footballers from Bruges
Association football defenders
Belgian Pro League players
Sport deaths in Belgium